College Lake  is a rural cottage community of the Halifax Regional Municipality in the Canadian province of Nova Scotia.

Navigator

External links
Explore HRM
College Lake

Communities in Halifax, Nova Scotia
General Service Areas in Nova Scotia